Transition Region and Coronal Explorer (TRACE, or Explorer 73, SMEX-4) was a NASA heliophysics and solar observatory designed to investigate the connections between fine-scale magnetic fields and the associated plasma structures on the Sun by providing high resolution images and observation of the solar photosphere, the transition region, and the solar corona. A main focus of the TRACE instrument is the fine structure of coronal loops low in the solar atmosphere. TRACE is the third spacecraft in the Small Explorer program, launched on 2 April 1998, and obtained its last science image on 21 June 2010, at 23:56 UTC.

Mission 
The Transition Region and Coronal Explorer (TRACE) is a NASA small explorer mission designed to examine the three-dimensional magnetic structures which emerge through the Sun's photosphere (the visible surface of the Sun) and define both the geometry and dynamics of the upper solar atmosphere (the transition region and corona). Its primary science objectives are to: (1) follow the evolution of magnetic field structures from the solar interior to the corona; (2) investigate the mechanisms of the heating of the outer solar atmosphere; and, (3) determine the triggers and onset of solar flares and mass ejections. TRACE is a single-instrument, three-axis stabilized spacecraft. The spacecraft attitude control system (ACS) utilizes three magnetic-torquer coils, a digital Sun sensor, six coarse Sun sensors, a three-axis magnetometer, four reaction wheels, and three two-axis inertial gyros to maintain pointing. In science mode the spacecraft uses an instrument-provided guide telescope as a fine guidance sensor to provide a pointing accuracy of less than 5 arcseconds. The solar array actually produces power of around 220 watts, 85 W of which is used each orbit by the spacecraft and 35 W of which is used by the instrument each orbit. The remaining power is used for operational and decontamination heating of the spacecraft and telescope. A 9 A-hour nickel–cadmium battery (NiCd) provides energy during time when the spacecraft is in the Earth's shadow. Communications are provided via a 5 W S-band transponder, providing up to 2.25 Mbit/s downlink data transmission and 2 kbit/s uplink. Data are transmitted up to six times daily. Data are stored on-board using a solid-state recorder capable of holding up to 300 MB. The command and data handling system uses a 32-bit 80386/80387 processor.

Spacecraft 
The satellite was built by NASA's Goddard Space Flight Center. Its telescope was constructed by a consortium led by Lockheed Martin's Advanced Technology Center. The optics were designed and built to a State of the art surface finish by the Smithsonian Astrophysical Observatory (SAO). The telescope has a  aperture and 1024 × 1024 charge-coupled device (CCD) detector giving an 8.5 arcminute field of view (FoV). The telescope is designed to take correlated images in a range of wavelengths from visible light through the Lyman alpha line to far ultraviolet. The different wavelength passbands correspond to plasma emission temperatures from 4,000 to 4,000,000 K. The optics use a special multilayer technique to focus the difficult-to-reflect extreme ultraviolet (EUV) light; the technique was first used for solar imaging in the late 1980s and 1990s, notably by the MSSTA and NIXT sounding rocket payloads.

Experiment

TRACE Imaging Telescope 
The field of view of the telescope is 8.5 x 8.5 arcminutes with a spatial resolution of one arcsecond. The light is focused on a 1024 x 1024 element CCD detector (0.5 arcseconds/pixel). The temporal resolution of the instrument is less than 1 second, although the nominal temporal resolution is 5 seconds. Exposure times for observations range between 2 ms and 260 seconds. The primary and secondary mirrors have normal-incidence coatings specially designed for EUV and UV observations which divide the mirrors into quadrants. These segmented coatings are designed to provide identically sized and perfectly coaligned images. Which mirror quadrant is used for an observation is determined by the position of a quadrant selector shutter mechanism, positioned behind the entrance aperture. Three of the mirror coatings provide for observations in specific iron emission bands: Fe IX (central wavelength/bandwidth: 17.3 nm/0.64 nm); Fe XII (19.5 nm/0.65 nm); and Fe XV (28.4 nm/1.07 nm). The final mirror coating allows broadband observations in the ultraviolet (centered on 500 nm). Further selection of observations in the UV can be made through the use of a filter wheel, mounted in front of the CCD. The filter wheel permits continuum observations (170 nm/20 nm) as well as observations in emission bands for C (carbon) I and Fe II (160 nm/27.5 nm), C IV (155 nm/2 nm), and H (Hydrogen) I (Lyman-alpha) (121.6 nm/8.4 nm). The TRACE primary mirror assembly is based on primary mirror support assemblies used in SWATH, a small explorer developed for the U.S. Air Force, and NIXT, a set of rocket flights flown by the Smithsonian Astrophysical Observatory (SAO) five times between 1983 and 1993. Many of the designs and some of the space flight hardware from the MDI instrument on Solar and Heliospheric Observatory (SoHO) was also used.

Image gallery

See also 

 Explorer program

References

External links 

 TRACE website by Lockheed Martin
 TRACE Data Center by Lockheed Martin
 TRACE website (archived) by NASA's Goddard Space Flight Center

Spacecraft launched in 1998
Explorers Program
Missions to the Sun
Solar telescopes
Ultraviolet telescopes
Solar space observatories
Spacecraft launched by Pegasus rockets